The New Caledonian records in swimming are the fastest ever performances of swimmers from New Caledonia, which are maintained by New Caledonia Swimming Association. New Caledonia is no official Fina member.

All records were set in finals unless noted otherwise.

Long Course (50 m)

Men

Women

Mixed relay

Short Course (25 m)

Men

Women

References

New Caledonia
Records